George Kay Kramer is an American philatelist who signed the Roll of Distinguished Philatelists in 2005.

References

American philatelists
Signatories to the Roll of Distinguished Philatelists
Living people
Year of birth missing (living people)
Place of birth missing (living people)